Thi (Quốc ngữ:  Thị;) is a Vietnamese name, usually given as a middle name to females (see: Vietnamese name). It may also refer to:

 City of Thi, a city in The Wizard of Oz
 thị, Vietnamese term for persimmons, specifically Diospyros decandra
 thi, a form of Kayan rice wine

See also
 THI (disambiguation)